Wladimiro may refer to:
 Wladimiro Ganzarolli (1932–2010), an Italian operatic bass-baritone
 Wladimiro Calarese (1930–2005), an Italian fencer
 Wladimiro "Tony" De Tomaso (born 1951), an Italian racing driver
 Wladimiro Falcone (born 1995), Italian footballer
 Wladimiro Guadagno (born 1965), an Italian actress, television personality
 Wladimiro Panizza (1945–2002), an Italian professional road bicycle racer

See also 
 Vladimiro

Italian masculine given names
Slavic-language names